Zeferino González (28 January 1831 – 29 November 1894) was a Spanish Dominican theologian, and philosopher, Archbishop of Seville and cardinal.

Life
On 28 November 1844, in the College of Ocania, González entered the Dominican Order, and a year later took his solemn vows. He was sent to Manila in 1848 to complete his studies, and in January 1853, he was made a lector of philosophy. The following year he was ordained priest. After teaching philosophy and theology for many years in the University of Santo Tomas, Manila, he returned to Spain in 1867, where, the year following, he was elected rector of Ocania College, discharging the duties of this office for three years.

In 1874 he was named Bishop of Málaga, but, before taking charge of this diocese, he was consecrated Bishop of Córdoba in October 1875. Eight years later he was removed to the archiepiscopal See of Seville, and in November 1884, he was created cardinal by Pope Leo XIII, with Santa Maria sopra Minerva as his titular church.

In May, 1885, Cardinal González was appointed to the primacy of Spain, was made Patriarch of the West Indies, vicar-general of the army, and major-chaplain to the royal chapel. After many years of service González, in December 1889, resigned all his offices and dignities, except that of the cardinalate, and retired from active life. The remaining five years of his life were spent in study and prayer.

He was honoured with medals of Isabella the Catholic and Charles III, he was appointed chancellor of Castile, was chosen as royal adviser, made a member of the Royal Academy of Languages, of History, of Moral and Political Sciences, and of the Roman Academy of St. Thomas Aquinas.

Works
Besides those below, among his several works are: "La Biblia y la ciencia"; "La infalibilidad pontificia" (pamphlet); "Discurso de recepción en la Academia Española" (pamphlet); "Discurso de recepción en la Academia de Ciencias políticas y morales" (pamphlet).

Estudios religiosos, políticos, científicos y sociales – volume 1, Madrid 1873
 Contains the three essays:
 La filosofía de la historia
 La inmortalidad del alma y sus destinos segun una teoría krauso-espiritista
 El positivismo materialista
Estudios religiosos, políticos, científicos y sociales – volume 2, Madrid 1873
 Contains the five essays:
 La Economia política y el cristianismo
 Los temblores de tierra
 Sobre una Biblioteca de teólogos españoles
 La definición de la infalibilidad pontificia
 Sermon de Santo Tomás de Aquino
Filosofía elemental – volume 1, second edition, Madrid 1876
Filosofía elemental – volume 2, second edition, Madrid 1876
Historia de la filosofía – volume 1, second edition, Madrid 1886
Historia de la filosofía – volume 2, second edition, Madrid 1886
Historia de la filosofía – volume 3, second edition, Madrid 1886
Historia de la filosofía – volume 4, second edition, Madrid 1886
Estudios sobre la filosofía de Santo Tomás – volume 1, second edition, Madrid 1886
Estudios sobre la filosofía de Santo Tomás – volume 2, second edition, Madrid 1886
Estudios sobre la filosofía de Santo Tomás – volume 3, second edition, Madrid 1887
Philosophia elementaria – volume 1: Logicam, psychologiam, idealogiam complectens, seventh edition, Madrid 1894
Philosophia elementaria – volume 2: Metaphysicam generalem atque specialem complectens, seventh edition, Madrid 1894
Philosophia elementaria – volume 3: Ethicam et historiam philosophiae complectens, seventh edition, Madrid 1894

References

Acta Cap. Ord. Praed. (Rome, 1885);
Hugo von Hurter, Nomenclator literarius, III (Innsbruck, 1895), 1499;
Vigil, La orden de praedicatores (Madrid, 1884), 297.

External links
 
Catholic Encyclopedia article
Biography

1831 births
1894 deaths
People from Asturias
Cardinals created by Pope Leo XIII
Dominican cardinals